The tables list the Malayalam films released in theatres in 2011. Premiere shows and film festival screenings are not considered as releases for this list.

Released films

The following is the list of Malayalam films released in theatres in the year 2011.

Malayalam films

45. Badrinath

2011
 2011
Malayalam
2011 in Indian cinema